Krzysztof Pływaczyk (born 11 February 1983) is a Polish biathlete. He competed at the Biathlon World Championships 2011, 2012 and 2013. He competed at the 2006 in Torino and the 2014 Winter Olympics in Sochi, in sprint and individual.

References 

1983 births
Living people
Polish male biathletes
Biathletes at the 2006 Winter Olympics
Biathletes at the 2014 Winter Olympics
Olympic biathletes of Poland
People from Wałbrzych